The 2014 Murmuri earthquake occurred on August 18 in the Zagros Mountains of Iran with a moment magnitude of 6.2 and a maximum Mercalli intensity of VIII (Severe). The thrust earthquake injured 60–330 people and was followed by a number of high intensity aftershocks.

Earthquake
The area had not seen a large seismic event since developments in Earth observation satellites allowed scientists to more precisely study earthquakes. Observations made using Interferometric synthetic aperture radar imply that different faults were ruptured by the mainshock and the largest aftershock, each leading to different surface deformations.

Damage
Phone lines, water, and electricity were cut off.  Eight villages were hit particularly hard, each losing around half of the homes in the area.

Aftershocks
In the several days following the mainshock, four strong aftershocks occurred. Within the first twenty-four hours, events with magnitudes of 5.6  and 5.4  occurred, each having a Mercalli intensity of VII (Very strong). Just over six hours later, a 6.0  and intensity VIII (Severe) shock occurred. Several days later, a 5.6  (intensity VII) shock occurred.

See also
 List of earthquakes in 2014
 List of earthquakes in Iran

References

Further reading

External links
Multiple techniques shed light on the August 2014 Murmuri, Iran earthquake sequence – Comet
Two Hundred and Fifty Housing Units Are Constructed at Dehloran Affected By Earthquake Regions – ReliefWeb
Mormori Earthquake of 18 August 2014, Mw.6.2 – International Institute of Earthquake Engineering and Seismology

2014 earthquakes
2014 in Iran
Earthquakes in Iran
August 2014 events in Iran